Deon Jackson (born February 18, 1999) is an American football running back for the Indianapolis Colts of the National Football League (NFL). He played college football at Duke.

High school
Jackson attended Pace Academy in Atlanta, Georgia where he played football.

College career
Jackson committed to Duke in 2016.

Statistics

Professional career

Jackson signed with the Indianapolis Colts as an undrafted free agent on May 6, 2021. He was waived on August 31, 2021, and re-signed to the practice squad the next day. He was promoted to the active roster on November 1.
In week 6 of the 2022 season, Jackson drew his first career start against the Jacksonville Jaguars after starting RB Jonathan Taylor and backup RB Nyheim Hines were both ruled out because of injuries.

References

1999 births
Living people
American football running backs
Duke Blue Devils football players
Indianapolis Colts players